Audenshaw is a town in Tameside, Greater Manchester, England.  The town contains eight listed buildings that are recorded in the National Heritage List for England.  All the listed buildings are designated at Grade II, the lowest of the three grades, which is applied to "buildings of national importance and special interest".  The listed buildings consist of houses, a farm building, a milestone, a church, a drinking trough, a former transformer pillar, and a war memorial


Buildings

References

Citations

Sources

Lists of listed buildings in Greater Manchester
Listed
Buildings and structures in Tameside